Swimhiking is a recreation activity which combines hiking and outdoor swimming. It has been conceived by Peter Hayes while hiking in the Lake District of England. When hiking and you arrive at a lake, you change into a swimming costume and put your clothes in a waterproof rucksack and you swim across the lake. On the other side you change back into your hiking gear and continue hiking.

External links
 BBC video River deep mountain high
 BBC video 'Swimhiker' takes the plunge
 The Guardian Walking with the fishes

Hiking
Swimming
Outdoor recreation